Xiaomi MIX Fold 2 is an Android-based foldable smartphone manufactured by Xiaomi. For the first time in the MIX Fold series, the phone developed in partnership with Leica camera, it was announced on August 11, 2022.

References 

Android (operating system) devices
Xiaomi smartphones
Mobile phones with multiple rear cameras
Mobile phones introduced in 2022
Flagship smartphones